Hoke is a surname and a given name.  Notable people with the name include:

Surname
 Brady Hoke (born 1958), American football coach, formerly head coach at the University of Michigan
 Chris Hoke (born 1976), American retired National Football League player
 Eldon Hoke (1958–1997), American musician
 Jacob Hoke (1825-1893), American businessman and author
 John Hoke III (born ?), Chief Design Officer, Nike, Inc.
 Jon Hoke (born 1957), American football coach and former player
 Lisa Hoke (born 1952), American artist 
 Martin Hoke (born 1952), American Republican politician
 Michael Hoke (1874–1944), orthopedic surgeon
 Robert Hoke (1837–1912), Confederate major general, businessman and railroad executive
 Stefan-Heinrich Höke (1905–1944), German World War II officer
 William A. Hoke (1851–1925), American politician and jurist

Given name
 Hoke Norris (1913–1977), American journalist and writer
 Hoke L. Smith (1931–2004), tenth president of Towson University
 M. Hoke Smith (1855–1931), American politician and newspaper owner
 Hoke Hooks Warner (1894–1947), American Major League Baseball player